DDoS mitigation is a set of network management techniques and/or tools, for resisting or mitigating the impact of distributed denial-of-service (DDoS) attacks on networks attached to the Internet, by protecting the target, and relay networks. DDoS attacks are a constant threat to businesses and organizations, by delaying service performance, or by shutting down a website entirely. 

DDoS mitigation works by identifying baseline conditions for network traffic by analyzing "traffic patterns", to allow threat detection and alerting. DDoS mitigation also requires identifying incoming traffic, to separate human traffic from human-like bots and hijacked web browsers. This process involves comparing signatures and examining different attributes of the traffic, including IP addresses, cookie variations, HTTP headers, and JavaScript fingerprints.

After the detection is made, the next process is filtering. Filtering can be done through anti-DDoS technology like connection tracking, IP reputation lists, deep packet inspection, blacklisting/whitelisting, or rate limiting. 

One technique is to pass network traffic addressed to a potential target network through high-capacity networks, with "traffic scrubbing" filters. 

Manual DDoS mitigation is no longer recommended, due to the size of attacks often outstripping the human resources available in many firms/organizations. Other methods to prevent DDoS attacks can be implemented, such as on-premises and/or cloud-based solution providers. On-premises mitigation technology (most commonly a hardware device) is often placed in front of the network. This would limit the maximum bandwidth available to what is provided by your Internet service provider. Common methods involve hybrid solutions, by combining on-premises filtering with cloud-based solutions.

Methods of attack
DDoS attacks are executed against websites and networks of selected victims. A number of vendors offer "DDoS-resistant" hosting services, mostly based on techniques similar to content delivery networks. Distribution avoids a single point of congestion and prevents the DDoS attack from concentrating on a single target.

One technique of DDoS attacks is to use misconfigured third-party networks, allowing the amplification of spoofed UDP packets. Proper configuration of network equipment, enabling ingress filtering and egress filtering, as documented in BCP 38 and RFC 6959, prevents amplification and spoofing, thus reducing the number of relay networks available to attackers.

Methods of mitigation
 Use of Client Puzzle Protocol, or Guided tour puzzle protocol
 Use of Content Delivery Network
 Blacklist of IP addresses
 Use of Intrusion detection system and Firewall

See also

 Internet security
 Web threat
 Vulnerability (computing)
 DDoS
 Cybercrime
 Cyberattack
 VPN

References

Computer network security
System administration

Cyberwarfare